Kary may refer to:

 Kary (name), is both a surname and a given name
 Kary, South Dakota, a ghost town
 KARY-FM, a radio station in Grandview, Washington, United States
 Kary, the fire fiend in the video game Final Fantasy
 K-ary, referring to arity in mathematics and computer science

See also 

 Cary (disambiguation)
Karey (disambiguation)